Derek Haldeman (born June 24, 1991) is an American sport shooter. In 2019, he won the silver medal in the men's trap event at the 2019 Pan American Games held in Lima, Peru. He also won the gold medal in the mixed trap event together with Ashley Carroll.

References

External links 
 

Living people
1991 births
Place of birth missing (living people)
American male sport shooters
Trap and double trap shooters
Pan American Games medalists in shooting
Pan American Games silver medalists for the United States
Shooters at the 2019 Pan American Games
Medalists at the 2019 Pan American Games
21st-century American people